The Green Party of Quebec fielded sixty-six candidates in the 2012 Quebec provincial election, none of whom were elected.

References

Candidates in Quebec provincial elections
Quebec 2012